All Saints is the name of two different compilation albums of instrumental works by the English musician David Bowie. 

The first was a two-disc set made as a Christmas gift for Bowie's friends and family in 1993; only 150 copies were made. The album became a collector's item. In 2001, a second album, All Saints: Collected Instrumentals 1977–1999, was released by Bowie. For this release, the tracks originating from the Black Tie White Noise (1993) album ("Pallas Athena", "The Wedding", "Looking for Lester"), as well as "South Horizon" from The Buddha of Suburbia (1993), were dropped, with "Brilliant Adventure" from Hours (1999) and the non-album single "Crystal Japan" (1980) appearing in their place.

Track listings
All songs written by David Bowie, except where noted.

Notes 

1993 compilation albums
2001 compilation albums
Albums produced by David Bowie
Albums produced by Tony Visconti
David Bowie compilation albums
Instrumental rock compilation albums
Virgin Records compilation albums
EMI Records compilation albums